Oregon Route 36 is an Oregon state highway that runs between the city of Mapleton in the Oregon Coast Range, and the city of Junction City in the Willamette Valley.  OR 36 traverses the Mapleton–Junction City Highway No. 229 of the Oregon state highway system.  The entire route of the highway is located within Lane County.

Route description
The western terminus of Oregon Route 36 is a junction with Oregon Route 126 in Mapleton. From Mapleton, the route heads due north through the Coast Range, then heads due east, following the course of the Siuslaw River. At the community of Swisshome it departs from the river, passing through the communities of Deadwood and Greenleaf, Triangle Lake, Blachly and Low Pass.  As it emerges from the mountains, it passes through the Alderwood State Wayside, and descends into the Willamette Valley.  It then passes through the communities of Goldson and Cheshire before ending just south of Junction City at an intersection with Oregon Route 99.

History
The highway was originally part of U.S. Route 28 and was the primary route between the Oregon Coast and the Eugene area; however, because of its winding nature, it was not suitable for high volumes of traffic.  The commercial importance of the highway diminished greatly when a more direct route between Mapleton and Eugene—the present day alignment of Oregon Route 126—was constructed.

Major intersections

References

External links
Transportation: Lane County Oregon

036
Transportation in Lane County, Oregon